Beáta Rakonczai (born 25 June 1977 in Nyíregyháza) is a Hungarian long-distance runner. She has competed in the Olympic marathon three times, coming 48th at the 2004 Olympics, not finishing in Beijing in 2008 and finishing 85th at the 2012 Summer Olympics with a time of 2:41:20.

References

1977 births
Living people
Hungarian female long-distance runners
Olympic athletes of Hungary
Athletes (track and field) at the 2004 Summer Olympics
Athletes (track and field) at the 2008 Summer Olympics
Athletes (track and field) at the 2012 Summer Olympics
People from Nyíregyháza
Hungarian female marathon runners
Sportspeople from Szabolcs-Szatmár-Bereg County